The Christmas EP is a Christmas album by musician Richard Marx. It was released on November 1, 2011 with the intention of recording an additional seven songs to add to the five songs to make a full-length album for release in 2012, which would become Christmas Spirit.

It was his 23rd overall album, with the lead-off single "Christmas Spirit" being his 32nd single.  The track reached #15 on Billboard's Adult Contemporary chart in December, giving Marx back-to-back Top 20 AC hits in 2011 (his first time since 1997).

Track listing

"Christmas Spirit" (Marx, Waybill)
"O Holy Night" (Adolphe Adam, Placide Cappeau)
"Silent Night" (duet with Sara Watkins) (Franz Xaver Gruber, Joseph Mohr)
"I Heard The Bells On Christmas Day" (Henry Wadsworth Longfellow, Johnny Marks)
"Alleluia" (Larry Gatlin)

Album credits

Personnel
Steve Brewster - drums
Cliff Colnot - string arrangements
Mark Hill - bass guitar
Brandon Marx - guitars, drums, background vocals
Jesse Marx - keyboards, background vocals
Lucas Marx - guitars, background vocals
Richard Marx - producer, writer, arrangements, lead vocals, acoustic guitar
Jerry McPherson - electric guitar
Jason Webb - keyboards, piano
Michael Omartian - piano
Sara Watkins - lead vocals
Fee Waybill - writer

Background Vocals
Opal Staples
Simbryt Whittington

Engineers
Chip Matthews
Justin Niebank
Matthew Prock
Benny Quinn

References

2011 EPs
2011 Christmas albums
Pop Christmas albums
Christmas albums by American artists
Richard Marx albums
Albums produced by Richard Marx
Self-released EPs
Christmas EPs